Apichet Puttan (born August 10, 1978), is a Thai retired professional footballer who played as a right back.

International career
Apichet has played 6 games for the national team and scored one goal. He first made his debut against Iraq in a friendly in 2006. In 2012, he called up by the Thai National Team to the 2012 King's Cup and played a match.

International goals

Honours

Club
Thailand Tobacco Monopoly
 Thai Premier League (1): 2004-05

Buriram United
 Thai Premier League (2): 2008, 2011
 Thai FA Cup (2): 2011, 2012
 Thai League Cup (2): 2011, 2012

External links

1978 births
Living people
Apichet Puttan
Apichet Puttan
Association football fullbacks
Apichet Puttan
Apichet Puttan
Apichet Puttan
Apichet Puttan
Apichet Puttan
Apichet Puttan
Apichet Puttan
Apichet Puttan
Apichet Puttan
2007 AFC Asian Cup players